New England Tablelands may refer to
 Northern Tablelands, a region in the Australian state of New South Wales
 New England Tablelands bioregion, a bioregion mostly in the Northern Tablelands